The 1969 Rutgers Scarlet Knights football team represented Rutgers University in the 1969 NCAA University Division football season. Rutgers finished second in the Middle Three Conference.

In their tenth season under head coach John F. Bateman, the Scarlet Knights compiled a 6–3 record and outscored their opponents 212 to 150. The team's statistical leaders included Rich Policastro with 1,690 passing yards, Steve Ferrughelli with 564 rushing yards, and Jim Benedict with 650 receiving yards. 

Throughout the year, Rutgers celebrated the centennial of college football, one hundred years since the 1869 game between Rutgers and Princeton, recognized as the first intercollegiate football game. The 1969 game against Princeton, which Rutgers won 29–0, was broadcast in the Eastern United States by ABC Television. Two weeks later, Rutgers was upset by Lehigh in a 7–17 loss, making this the first year since 1965 that they did not sweep the Middle Three, and the first year since 1957 that Rutgers did not win or at least tie for the championship.

Rutgers played nine games, rather than the scheduled 10, because a November 15 matchup at Holy Cross was canceled following an outbreak of hepatitis among the Massachusetts school's football team.

The Scarlet Knights played their home games at Rutgers Stadium in Piscataway, New Jersey, across the river from the university's main campus in New Brunswick.

Schedule

References

Rutgers
Rutgers Scarlet Knights football seasons
Rutgers Scarlet Knights football